The 1970 Critérium du Dauphiné Libéré, also known as the 1970 Criterium of the Six Provinces, was the 22nd edition of the cycle race and was held from 19 May to 25 May 1970. The race was won by Luis Ocaña of the Bic team.

Teams
Ten teams, containing a total of 99 riders, participated in the race:

 
 
 Laurens–Caballero

Route

General classification

References

Further reading

1970
1970 in French sport
1970 Super Prestige Pernod
May 1970 sports events in Europe